Flore Célestine Thérèse Henriette Tristán y Moscoso better known as Flora Tristan (7 April 1803 – 14 November 1844) was a French-Peruvian socialist writer and activist. She made important contributions to early feminist theory, and argued that the progress of women's rights was directly related with the progress of the working class.  She wrote several works, the best known of which are Peregrinations of a Pariah (1838), Promenades in London (1840), and The Workers' Union (1843).
Tristan was the grandmother of the painter Paul Gauguin.

Early life 
Her full name was Flore Célestine Thérèse Henriette Tristán y Moscoso. Her father, Mariano Eusebio Antonio Tristán y Moscoso, was a colonel of the Spanish Navy, born in Arequipa, a city of Peru. His family was one of the most powerful in the south of the country; his brother Pío de Tristán became viceroy of Peru. Flora Tristan's mother, Anne-Pierre Laisnay, was French; the couple met in Bilbao, Spain.

When her father died in 1807, before her fifth birthday, the situation of Tristan and her mother changed drastically from the high standards of living they were accustomed to. In 1833 she travelled to Arequipa to claim her paternal inheritance, which was in possession of her uncle, Juan Pío de Tristán y Moscoso. She remained in Peru until 16 July 1834. Though she never secured the inheritance that brought her there, Tristan wrote a travel diary about her experiences during Peru's tumultuous post-independence period. The diary was published in 1838 as Pérégrinations d'une paria. Around this time, Tristan met and was influenced by the philosophy of the androgynous mystic Simon Ganneau, as well as her longtime friend Éliphas Lévi.

The Workers' Union 
Tristan wrote this essay in 1843 after an extensive stay in Peru and a short trip to Britain where she produced works on the social conditions along the Channel. The Workers' Union was the last of her writings and gave her a public persona of political activist.  Through this work, one can compare Tristan to similar Utopian Socialists including Charles Fourier (whom she knew personally) and the works of the French Socialists, the Saint Simonians, whose works she had studied through the years.  Tristan took into account the studies and teachings of these previous socialists, but created a different solution to the suppression of not only the proletariat, but the working women as well. She was the first to connect the freedom of the working class with the advancement of women's rights.

Tristan recognized that the working class had been fighting for over twenty-five years to no avail. Her suggested solution was to act and create a Workers' Union. She saw a great advantage to this because “divided, you are weak and fall, crushed underfoot by all sorts of misery!  Union makes power. You have numbers in your favor, and numbers mean a great deal.” Through union dues, she argued for plans to provide the proletariats’ children with safe havens and increased access to education, to build palaces for the ill and wounded workers, and to reach out to manufacturers and financiers, including those among the nobility, in order to sustain and maintain such programs.

In two different essays, Flora Tristan acknowledged the need for the liberation of women in order to complete the emancipation of the working class, seeing as the working class itself was fractured. She argued that once society fixes these fissures (women's rights), the rest would fall into place. In that sense, women's liberation would lead to the greatest good for the greatest number of people, thereby supporting a Utilitarian mindset. Despite her positive stance on women's liberation, she recognized that in the post-revolution French society, women would not be easily considered equal just because they were human beings. She therefore had to base her argument on a series of benefits to the male majority. In addition to introducing new ways of thinking about socialism, Tristan was also the first to connect the emerging social rights movement to the idea of women's liberation. In doing so, she laid the groundwork for a new ideology—feminism. She made the analogy between the proletariat to the bourgeoisie and the wife to the family before Friedrich Engels, as is referenced in a posthumous collection of her notes by Abbe Constant entitled The Emancipation of Woman and the Testament of the Pariah: “The most oppressed man finds a being to oppress, his wife: she is the proletarian of the proletarian.” Tristan's analogy is also more articulate than Engels'. The Worker's Union explained that the liberation of women would be the continuation of what the French Revolution had initiated. Like the proletariat, women would also have their day: “What happened to the proletariat, it must be agreed, is a good omen for women when their '1789' rings out.”

Her effort at creating a common union was the last before her early death from typhoid fever in 1844. By drawing and building upon her colleagues’ and mentors’ socialist concepts, she attempted to create a logical and reasonable plan that the proletariat could realistically achieve. She opted to change the angle previously attempted and was able to include women's rights as an important lever in the machine to create an independent Workers' Union.

Contributions to historiography 
Repressed for the most part in history, women's historiography has been gaining traction in the attempt of historians to highlight “minoritized” histories. Through her writings, Flora Tristan was able to show the ability of women to conceptualize the idea of freedom which emanated from her works.

Seeing the failure of the promises of capitalism, Flora Tristan works would entail a deep desire for social progress – combining the women struggle with socialism. When one would trace socialism going together with feminism, Flora Tristan would become the key person in this amalgamation. Flora Tristan would be known as the “mother of feminism and of popular communitarian socialism”, fighting the prejudice and misogyny that powers women's oppression.

Tristan would organize the fragmented ideas of women equality at that time, brought by the French Revolution. She would provide the platform for the later rise of feminism in the late 19th century. Tristan would die “defending the rights of the proletarian or rather demanding them for him; she died whilst preaching, through her words and her actions, the law of union and love that she had brought to him”.

Flora Tristan would be “the first woman to try to merge the proto-feminist and social discourses into a critical synthesis, opening the way leading for the future shape of feminism of a proletarian class character, which finds it inconceivable that there exist oppressed women who are capable of oppressing other women”.

Tristan would highlight themes and ideas that gives primacy to worker's rights. She would be the first one to conceive the idea that the emancipation of the proletariat would be the synthesis of the people's struggle against the bourgeoisie. She would further add that this was only to be possible with the emancipation of the sexes.

Flora Tristan's life, works, and ideals have proved fruitful for the excavation of women's work through time. Establishing histories that would focus on the contribution of women, Flora Tristan has provided much in the progressing excavation of women's role in our history.

Recognition 

Mario Vargas Llosa, in his 2003 historical novel The Way to Paradise, analyzes Flora Tristan and her grandson Paul Gauguin's contrasting quests for the ideal life through their experiences in and outside their native France.

Place Flora Tristan in the XIVe Arrondissement, Paris, is marked with a sign describing Tristan as "Femme de Lettres" and "Militante Féministe".

The Centre Flora Tristan in Châtillon is a women's refuge. The Ecole Maternelle Flora Tristan (nursery school) in Orléans  and the Lycee Flora Tristan (secondary school) in Noisy-le-Grand are also named after her.

The Flora Tristán Peruvian Women's Center is a non-governmental organization named in her honor.

Family tree

References

Bibliography 

 Tristan, Flora. The Workers Union. Translated by Beverly Livingston.  Chicago: University of Illinois Press, 1983, 77–78.
 Máire Cross. The Feminism of Flora Tristan. Berg, Oxford, 1992. 
 Máire Cross. The Letter in Flora Tristan's Politics, 1835-1844, Basingstoke: Palgrave, 2004. 
 Flora Tristan’s Diary: The Tour of France 1843–1844, translated, annotated and introduced by Máire Fedelma Cross.  Berne: Peter Lang, 2002. 
 Dominique Desanti. A Woman in Revolt: A Biography of Flora Tristan. New York: Crown Publishers, Inc., 1976. 
 The London Journal of Flora Tristan, translated, annotated and introduced by Jean Hawkes. London: Virago Press, 1982. 
 Tristan, Flora. Peregrinations of a Pariah, translated by Jean Hawkes. London: Virago Press, 1985. 
 Beik, Doris and Paul. Flora Tristan: Utopian Feminist: Her Travel Diaries and Personal Crusade.  Bloomington: Indiana University Press, 1993.
 Dijkstra, Sandra. Flora Tristan: Feminism in the Age of George Sand. London: Pluto Press, 1992. 
 Krulic, Brigitte. ‘’Flora Tristan.’’ Paris: Gallimard/NRF, 2022. 
 Melzer, Sara E. and Rabine, Leslie W. Rebel Daughters: Women and the French Revolution. New York: Oxford University Press, 1992, 284.
 Schneider, Joyce Anne. Flora Tristan: Feminist, Socialist, and Free Spirit. New York: Morrow, 1980. .
 Strumingher, Laura L. The Odyssey of Flora Tristan. New York: Peter Lang, 1988.  University of Cincinnati Studies in Historical and Contemporary Europe, vol. 2.

External links 
 
Ibero-American Electronic Text Series: Tristan, Flora, Peregrinaciones de una Paria (Selección). Presented online by the University of Wisconsin Digital Collections Center.
 Archive of Flora Tristan Papers at the International Institute of Social History
 Excerpts and full text of Promenades in London (1840) at the Marxist Internet Archive (in Spanish)   

1803 births
1844 deaths
19th-century French non-fiction writers
19th-century French women writers
Feminist writers
French anti-capitalists
French feminists
French people of Spanish descent
French socialists
French socialist feminists
French suffragists
French women non-fiction writers
Peruvian feminists
Peruvian women activists
Peruvian people of Spanish descent
Utopian socialists
Writers from Paris
19th-century French women politicians